Vedevåg is a locality in Lindesberg Municipality, Örebro County, Sweden with 714 inhabitants in 2015.

References 

Populated places in Örebro County
Populated places in Lindesberg Municipality